Hermann Hauksson (born 24 January 1972) is an Icelandic former basketball player and a former member of Icelandic national team. He played the majority of his career in the Úrvalsdeild karla with KR and Njarðvík but also played in Belgium for Sint-Niklaas. In 1997, he was named the Úrvalsdeild karla Domestic Player of the Year. In 1999, he won the Icelandic Cup with Njarðvík after scoring the game-tying three pointer that sent the game to overtime. He retired following the 2001–2002 season due to lingering back injuries.

Since 2015, he has been an analyst for Domino's Körfuboltakvöld.

Icelandic national team
From 1994 to 2000, Hermann played 64 games for the Icelandic national team.

Personal life
Hermann is the father of basketball player and national team member Martin Hermannsson. In 2014, they became the first father-son duo to have been named the Úrvalsdeild karla Domestic Player of the Year.

References

External links
Úrvalsdeild stats at kki.is

1972 births
Living people
Forwards (basketball)
Hermann Hauksson
Hermann Hauksson
Hermann Hauksson
Herbert Arnarson
Hermann Hauksson